Praekelt.org is an African nonprofit organization dedicated to using mobile technology to improve the lives of people living in poverty. It was founded in 2007 as an offshoot of Praekelt Consulting.

Notable projects that the organization is involved in include:

 Young Africa Live, a mobile community where young people can talk candidly and learn about love, intimate relationships and sexual intercourse and HIV/AIDS
 Project Masiluleke (Zulu for "let us advise" or "may we give counsel"), a campaign to promote AIDS awareness using "Please Call Me" messages, in partnership with the PopTech Accelerator and other companies
 TxtAlert, an appointment reminder system for people on chronic medication
 Yoza, a project to promote youth literacy using short cellphone stories, or m-novels, developed in conjunction with the Shuttleworth Foundation
 MomConnect, an application for pregnant women

See also 
 Mobile technology in Africa
 mHealth

References

External links 
 

Non-profit organisations based in South Africa
Organizations established in 2007
Telecommunications in Africa